Seven ships of the Royal Navy have been named HMS Snake:

 was a 14-gun sloop purchased in 1776. Two American privateers captured her in 1781. 
 was the French prize Seine that  captured and the Royal Navy purchased in 1777 at Antigua and armed with 10-16 guns. She was used as a slop ship from 1781 and was sold in 1783.
 was an 18-gun ship-sloop that, until 1809, differed only in her rig from the s. She was launched in 1797 and sold in 1816.
 was a 16-gun brig-sloop launched in 1832 and wrecked in 1847.
 was a steam tender launched in 1838 and used as a hulk for harbour service from 1863.
 was an  wooden screw gunvessel launched in 1854 and sold in 1864.
 was an  launched in 1871. She was completed as a dockyard cable lighter in 1907 and was renamed YC 15.

Royal Navy ship names